The siege of Leningrad was a prolonged military blockade undertaken by the Axis powers against the Soviet city of Leningrad (present-day Saint Petersburg) on the Eastern Front of World War II. Germany's Army Group North advanced from the south, while the German-allied Finnish army invaded from the north and completed the ring around the city.

The siege began on 8 September 1941, when the Wehrmacht severed the last road to the city. Although Soviet forces managed to open a narrow land corridor to the city on 18 January 1943, the Red Army did not lift the siege until 27 January 1944, 872 days after it began. The blockade became one of the longest and most destructive sieges in history, and it was possibly the costliest siege in history due to the number of casualties which were suffered throughout its duration. While not classed as a war crime at the time,
in the 21st century, some historians have classified it as a genocide due to the systematic starvation and intentional destruction of the city's civilian population.

Background

Leningrad's capture was one of three strategic goals in the German Operation Barbarossa and the main target of Army Group North. The strategy was motivated by Leningrad's political status as the former capital of Russia and the symbolic capital of the Russian Revolution and Bolshevism hated by the Nazi Party, the city's military importance as a main base of the Soviet Baltic Fleet, and its industrial strength, including its numerous arms factories. In 1939, the city was responsible for 11% of all Soviet industrial output.

It has been said that Adolf Hitler was so confident of capturing Leningrad that he had invitations printed to the victory celebrations to be held in the city's Hotel Astoria.

Although various theories have been put forward about Germany's plans for Leningrad, including making it the capital of the new Ingermanland province of the Reich in Generalplan Ost, it is clear Hitler intended to utterly destroy the city and its population. According to a directive sent to Army Group North on 29 September:

Hitler's ultimate plan was to raze Leningrad and give areas north of the River Neva to the Finns.

Preparations

German plans

Army Group North under Field Marshal Wilhelm Ritter von Leeb advanced to Leningrad, its primary objective. By early August, Army Group North was seriously over-extended, having advanced on a widening front and dispersed its forces on several axes of advance. Leeb estimated he needed 35 divisions for all of his tasks, while he only had 26. The attack resumed on 10 August but immediately encountered strong opposition around Luga. Elsewhere, Leeb's forces were able to take Kingisepp and Narva on 17 August. The army group reached Chudovo on 20 August, severing the rail link between Leningrad and Moscow. Tallinn fell on 28 August.

Finnish military forces were north of Leningrad, while German forces occupied territories to the south. Both German and Finnish forces had the goal of encircling Leningrad and maintaining the blockade perimeter, thus cutting off all communication with the city and preventing the defenders from receiving any supplies – although Finnish participation in the blockade mainly consisted of a recapture of lands lost in the Winter War. The Germans planned on lack of food being their chief weapon against the citizens; German scientists had calculated the city would reach starvation after only a few weeks.

Leningrad fortified region

On Friday, 27 June 1941, the Council of Deputies of the Leningrad administration organised "First response groups" of civilians. In the next days, Leningrad's civilian population was informed of the danger and over a million citizens were mobilised for the construction of fortifications. Several lines of defences were built along the city's perimeter to repel hostile forces approaching from north and south by means of civilian resistance.

In the south, the fortified line ran from the mouth of the Luga River to Chudovo, Gatchina, Uritsk, Pulkovo and then through the Neva River. Another line of defence passed through Peterhof to Gatchina, Pulkovo, Kolpino and Koltushy. In the north the defensive line against the Finns, the Karelian Fortified Region, had been maintained in Leningrad's northern suburbs since the 1930s, and was now returned to service. Even the guns from the cruiser  were removed from the ship to be used to defend Leningrad.

Establishment

The 4th Panzer Group from East Prussia took Pskov following a swift advance and reached Novgorod by 16 August. After the capture of Novgorod, General Hoepner's 4th Panzer Group continued its progress towards Leningrad. However, the 18th Army – despite some 350,000 men lagging behind – forced its way to Ostrov and Pskov after the Soviet troops of the Northwestern Front retreated towards Leningrad. On 10 July, both Ostrov and Pskov were captured and the 18th Army reached Narva and Kingisepp, from where advance toward Leningrad continued from the Luga River line. This had the effect of creating siege positions from the Gulf of Finland to Lake Ladoga, with the eventual aim of isolating Leningrad from all directions. The Finnish Army was then expected to advance along the eastern shore of Lake Ladoga.

The last rail connection to Leningrad was cut on 30 August, when the German forces reached the River Neva. In early September, Leeb was confident Leningrad was about to fall. Having received reports on the evacuation of civilians and industrial goods, Leeb and the OKH believed the Red Army was preparing to abandon the city. Consequently, on 5 September, he received new orders, including the destruction of the Red Army forces around the city. By 15 September, Panzer Group 4 was to be transferred to Army Group Centre so it could participate in a renewed offensive towards Moscow. The expected surrender did not materialise although the renewed German offensive cut off the city by 8 September. Lacking sufficient strength for major operations, Leeb had to accept the army group might not be able to take the city, although hard fighting continued along his front throughout October and November.

Orders of battle

Germany

Army Group North (Feldmarschall Wilhelm Ritter von Leeb)
18th Army (Georg von Küchler)
XXXXII Corps (2 infantry divisions)
XXVI Corps (3 infantry divisions)
16th Army (Ernst Busch)
XXVIII Corps (Mauritz von Wiktorin) (2 infantry, 1 armoured divisions)
I Corps (2 infantry divisions)
X Corps (3 infantry divisions)
II Corps (3 infantry divisions)
(L Corps – Under 9th Army) (2 infantry divisions)
4th Panzer Group (Erich Hoepner)
XXXVIII Corps (Friedrich-Wilhelm von Chappuis) (1 infantry division)
XXXXI Motorized Corps (Georg-Hans Reinhardt) (1 infantry, 1 motorised, 1 armoured divisions)
LVI Motorized Corps (Erich von Manstein) (1 infantry, 1 motorised, 1 armoured, 1 panzergrenadier divisions)

Finland
Finnish Defence Forces HQ (Finnish Marshal Mannerheim)
I Corps (2 infantry divisions)
II Corps (2 infantry divisions)
IV Corps (3 infantry divisions)

Italy
XII Squadriglia MAS (Mezzi d'Assalto) (Italian for "12th Assault Vessel Squadron") ( Giuseppe Bianchini) Regia Marina

Spain
Blue Division, officially designated as 250. Infanterie-Division by the German Army and as the División Española de Voluntarios by the Spanish Army; General Esteban Infantes took command of this unit of Spanish volunteers at the Eastern Front during World War II.

Soviet Union
Northern Front (Lieutenant General Popov)
7th Army (2 rifle, 1 militia divisions, 1 naval infantry brigade, 3 motorised rifle and 1 armoured regiments)
8th Army
10th Rifle Corps (2 rifle divisions)
11th Rifle Corps (3 rifle divisions)
Separate Units (3 rifle divisions)
14th Army
42nd Rifle Corps (2 rifle divisions)
Separate Units (2 rifle divisions, 1 Fortified area, 1 motorised rifle regiment)
23rd Army
19th Rifle Corps (3 rifle divisions)
Separate Units (2 rifle, 1 motorised divisions, 2 Fortified areas, 1 rifle regiment)
Luga Operation Group
41st Rifle Corps (3 rifle divisions)
Separate Units (1 armoured brigade, 1 rifle regiment)
Kingisepp Operation Group
Separate Units (2 rifle, 2 militia, 1 armoured divisions, 1 Fortified area)
Separate Units (3 rifle divisions, 4 guard militia divisions, 3 Fortified areas, 1 rifle brigade)

The 14th Army of the Soviet Red Army defended Murmansk and the 7th Army defended Ladoga Karelia; thus they did not participate in the initial stages of the siege. The 8th Army was initially part of the Northwestern Front and retreated through the Baltics. It was transferred to the Northern Front on 14 July when the Soviets evacuated Tallinn.

On 23 August, the Northern Front was divided into the Leningrad Front and the Karelian Front, as it became impossible for front headquarters to control everything between Murmansk and Leningrad.

Zhukov states, "Ten volunteer opolcheniye divisions were formed in Leningrad in the first three months of the war, as well as 16 separate artillery and machine-gun opolcheniye battalions."

Severing lines of communication
On 6 August, Hitler repeated his order: "Leningrad first, Donetsk Basin second, Moscow third." Arctic convoys using the Northern Sea Route delivered American Lend-Lease and British food and war materiel supplies to the Murmansk railhead (although the rail link to Leningrad was cut off by Finnish armies just north of the city), as well as several other locations in Lapland.

Encirclement of Leningrad

Finnish intelligence had broken some of the Soviet military codes and read their low-level communications. This was particularly helpful for Hitler, who constantly requested intelligence information about Leningrad. Finland's role in Operation Barbarossa was laid out in Hitler's Directive 21, "The mass of the Finnish army will have the task, in accordance with the advance made by the northern wing of the German armies, of tying up maximum Russian (sic – Soviet) strength by attacking to the west, or on both sides, of Lake Ladoga". The last rail connection to Leningrad was severed on 30 August, when the Germans reached the Neva River. On 8 September, the road to the besieged city was severed when the Germans reached Lake Ladoga at Shlisselburg, leaving just a corridor of land between Lake Ladoga and Leningrad which remained unoccupied by Axis forces. Bombing on 8 September caused 178 fires.

On 21 September, German High Command considered how to destroy Leningrad. Occupying the city was ruled out "because it would make us responsible for food supply". The resolution was to lay the city under siege and bombardment, starving its population. "Early next year, we [will] enter the city (if the Finns do it first we do not object), lead those still alive into inner Russia or into captivity, wipe Leningrad from the face of the earth through demolitions, and hand the area north of the Neva to the Finns." On 7 October, Hitler sent a further directive signed by Alfred Jodl reminding Army Group North not to accept capitulation.

Finnish participation

By August 1941, the Finns advanced to within  of the northern suburbs of Leningrad at the 1939 Finnish-Soviet border, threatening the city from the north; they were also advancing through East Karelia, east of Lake Ladoga, and threatening the city from the east. The Finnish forces crossed the pre-Winter War border on the Karelian Isthmus by eliminating Soviet salients at Beloostrov and Kirjasalo, thus straightening the frontline so that it ran along the old border near the shores of Gulf of Finland and Lake Ladoga, and those positions closest to Leningrad still lying on the pre-Winter War border.

According to Soviet claims, the Finnish advance was stopped in September through resistance by the Karelian Fortified Region; however, Finnish troops had already earlier in August 1941 received orders to halt the advance after reaching their goals, some of which lay beyond the pre-Winter War border. After reaching their respective goals, the Finns halted their advance and started moving troops to East Karelia.

For the next three years, the Finns did little to contribute to the battle for Leningrad, maintaining their lines. Their headquarters rejected German pleas for aerial attacks against Leningrad and did not advance farther south from the Svir River in occupied East Karelia (160 kilometres northeast of Leningrad), which they had reached on 7 September. In the southeast, the Germans captured Tikhvin on 8 November, but failed to complete their encirclement of Leningrad by advancing further north to join with the Finns at the Svir River. On 9 December, a counter-attack of the Volkhov Front forced the Wehrmacht to retreat from their Tikhvin positions in the Volkhov River line.

On 6 September 1941, Germany's Chief of Staff Alfred Jodl visited Helsinki. His main goal was to persuade Mannerheim to continue the offensive. In 1941, President Ryti declared to the Finnish Parliament that the aim of the war was to restore the territories lost during the Winter War and gain more territories in the east to create a "Greater Finland". After the war, Ryti stated: "On August 24, 1941 I visited the headquarters of Marshal Mannerheim. The Germans aimed us at crossing the old border and continuing the offensive to Leningrad. I said that the capture of Leningrad was not our goal and that we should not take part in it. Mannerheim and Minister of Defense Walden agreed with me and refused the offers of the Germans. The result was a paradoxical situation: the Germans could not approach Leningrad from the north..." There was little or no systematic shelling or bombing from the Finnish positions.

The proximity of the Finnish border –  from downtown Leningrad – and the threat of a Finnish attack complicated the defence of the city. At one point, the defending Front Commander, Popov, could not release reserves opposing the Finnish forces to be deployed against the Wehrmacht because they were needed to bolster the 23rd Army's defences on the Karelian Isthmus. Mannerheim terminated the offensive on 31 August 1941, when the army had reached the 1939 border. Popov felt relieved, and redeployed two divisions to the German sector on 5 September.

Subsequently, the Finnish forces reduced the salients of Beloostrov and Kirjasalo, which had threatened their positions at the sea coast and south of the River Vuoksi. Lieutenant General Paavo Talvela and Colonel Järvinen, the commander of the Finnish Coastal Brigade responsible for Ladoga, proposed to the German headquarters the blocking of Soviet convoys on Lake Ladoga. The idea was proposed to the Germans on their own behalf going past both Finnish Navy HQ and General HQ. Germans responded positively to the proposition and informed the slightly surprised Finns—who apart from Talvela and Järvinen had very little knowledge of the proposition—that transport of the equipment for the Ladoga operation was already arranged. The German command formed the 'international' naval detachment (which also included the Italian XII Squadriglia MAS) under Finnish command and the Einsatzstab Fähre Ost under German command. These naval units operated against the supply route in the summer and autumn of 1942, the only period the units were able to operate as freezing waters then forced the lightly equipped units to be moved away, and changes in front lines made it impractical to reestablish these units later in the war.

Defensive operations

The Leningrad Front (initially the Leningrad Military District) was commanded by Marshal Kliment Voroshilov. It included the 23rd Army in the northern sector between the Gulf of Finland and Lake Ladoga, and the 48th Army in the western sector between the Gulf of Finland and the Slutsk–Mga position. The Leningrad Fortified Region, the Leningrad garrison, the Baltic Fleet forces, and Koporye, Pulkovo, and Slutsk–Kolpino operational groups were also present.

Defence of civilian evacuees
According to Zhukov, "Before the war Leningrad had a population of 3,103,000 and 3,385,000 counting the suburbs. As many as 1,743,129, including 414,148 children were evacuated" between 29 June 1941 and 31 March 1943. They were moved to the Volga area, the Urals, Siberia and Kazakhstan.

By September 1941, the link with the Volkhov Front (commanded by Kirill Meretskov) was severed and the defensive sectors were held by four armies: 23rd Army in the northern sector, 42nd Army on the western sector, 55th Army on the southern sector, and the 67th Army on the eastern sector. The 8th Army of the Volkhov Front had the responsibility of maintaining the logistic route to the city in coordination with the Ladoga Flotilla. Air cover for the city was provided by the Leningrad military district PVO Corps and Baltic Fleet naval aviation units.

The defensive operation to protect the 1,400,000 civilian evacuees was part of the Leningrad counter-siege operations under the command of Andrei Zhdanov, Kliment Voroshilov, and Aleksei Kuznetsov. Additional military operations were carried out in coordination with Baltic Fleet naval forces under the general command of Admiral Vladimir Tributs. The Ladoga Flotilla under the command of V. Baranovsky, S.V. Zemlyanichenko, P.A. Traynin, and B.V. Khoroshikhin also played a major military role in helping with evacuation of the civilians.

Bombardment

The first success of the Leningrad air defence took place on the night of 23 June. The Ju-88A bomber from the 1st air corps KGr.806 was damaged by the AA guns fire of the 15th battery of the 192nd anti-aircraft artillery regiment, and made an emergency landing. All crew members, including commander, Lieutenant Hans Turmeyer, were captured on the ground. The commander of the 15th battery, lieutenant, Alexey Pimchenkov was awarded the Order of the Red Banner.

By Monday, 8 September, German forces had largely surrounded the city, cutting off all supply routes to Leningrad and its suburbs. Unable to press home their offensive, and facing defences of the city organised by Marshal Zhukov, the Axis armies laid siege to the city for "900 days and nights".

The air attack of Friday, 19 September, was particularly brutal. It was the heaviest air raid Leningrad would suffer during the war, as 276 German bombers hit the city killing 1,000 civilians. Many of those killed were recuperating from battle wounds in hospitals that were hit by German bombs. Six air raids occurred that day. Five hospitals were damaged in the bombing, as well as the city's largest shopping bazaar. Hundreds of people had run from the street into the store to take shelter from the air raid.

Artillery bombardment of Leningrad began in August, increasing in intensity during 1942 with the arrival of new equipment. It was stepped up further during 1943, when several times as many shells and bombs were used as in the year before. Against this, the Soviet Baltic Fleet Navy aviation made over 100,000 air missions to support their military operations during the siege. German shelling and bombing killed 5,723 and wounded 20,507 civilians in Leningrad during the siege.

Supplying the defenders

To sustain the defence of the city, it was vitally important for the Red Army to establish a route for bringing a constant flow of supplies into Leningrad. This route, which became known as the Road of Life, was effected over the southern part of Lake Ladoga and the corridor of land which remained unoccupied by Axis forces between Lake Ladoga and Leningrad. Transport across Lake Ladoga was achieved by means of watercraft during the warmer months and land vehicles driven over thick ice in winter (hence the route becoming known as "The Ice Road"). The security of the supply route was ensured by the Ladoga Flotilla, the Leningrad PVO Corps, and route security troops. Vital food supplies were thus transported to the village of Osinovets, from where they were transferred and transported over  via a small suburban railway to Leningrad. The route had to be used also to evacuate civilians, since no evacuation plans had been executed in the chaos of the first winter of the war, and the city was completely isolated until 20 November, when the ice road over Lake Ladoga became operational. Vehicles risked becoming stuck in the snow or sinking through broken ice caused by constant German bombardments, but the road brought necessary military and food supplies in and took civilians and wounded soldiers out, allowing the city to continue resisting the enemy.

Effect on the city

The two-and-a-half-year siege caused the greatest destruction and the largest loss of life ever known in a modern city. On Hitler's direct orders the Wehrmacht looted and then destroyed most of the imperial palaces, such as the Catherine Palace, Peterhof Palace, Ropsha, Strelna, Gatchina, and other historic landmarks located outside the city's defensive perimeter, with many art collections transported to Germany. A number of factories, schools, hospitals and other civil infrastructure were destroyed by air raids and long range artillery bombardment.

The 872 days of the siege caused extreme famine in the Leningrad region through disruption of utilities, water, energy and food supplies. This resulted in the deaths of up to 1,500,000 soldiers and civilians and the evacuation of 1,400,000 more (mainly women and children), many of whom died during evacuation due to starvation and bombardment. Piskaryovskoye Memorial Cemetery in Leningrad holds half a million civilian victims of the siege alone. Economic destruction and human losses in Leningrad on both sides exceeded those of the Battle of Stalingrad, the Battle of Moscow, or the bombing of Tokyo. The siege of Leningrad ranks as the most lethal siege in world history, and some historians speak of the siege operations in terms of genocide, as a "racially motivated starvation policy" that became an integral part of the unprecedented German war of extermination against populations of the Soviet Union generally.

Civilians in the city suffered from extreme starvation, especially in the winter of 1941–42. From November 1941 to February 1942 the only food available to the citizen was 125 grams of bread per day, of which 50–60% consisted of sawdust and other inedible admixtures. In conditions of extreme temperatures (down to ), and with city transport out of service, even a distance of a few kilometres to a food distribution kiosk created an insurmountable obstacle for many citizens. Deaths peaked in January–February 1942 at 100,000 per month, mostly from starvation. People often died on the streets, and citizens soon became accustomed to the sight of death.

Cannibalism
While reports of cannibalism appeared in the winter of 1941–42, NKVD records on the subject were not published until 2004. Most evidence for cannibalism that surfaced before this time was anecdotal. Anna Reid points out that "for most people at the time, cannibalism was a matter of second-hand horror stories rather than direct personal experience". Indicative of Leningraders' fears at the time, police would often threaten uncooperative suspects with imprisonment in a cell with cannibals. Dimitri Lazarev, a diarist during the worst moments in the Leningrad siege, recalls his daughter and niece reciting a terrifying nursery rhyme adapted from a pre-war song:

NKVD files report the first use of human meat as food on 13 December 1941. The report outlines thirteen cases, which range from a mother smothering her eighteen-month-old to feed her three older children to a plumber killing his wife to feed his sons and nieces.

By December 1942 the NKVD had arrested 2,105 cannibals – dividing them into two legal categories: corpse-eating (trupoyedstvo) and person-eating (lyudoyedstvo). The latter were usually shot while the former were sent to prison. The Soviet Criminal Code had no provision for cannibalism, so all convictions were carried out under Code Article 59–3, "special category banditry". Instances of person-eating were significantly lower than that of corpse-eating; of the 300 people arrested in April 1942 for cannibalism, only 44 were murderers. 64% of cannibals were female, 44% were unemployed, 90% were illiterate or with only basic education, 15% were rooted inhabitants, and only 2% had any criminal records. More cases occurred in the outlying districts than in the city itself. Cannibals were often unsupported women with dependent children and no previous convictions, which allowed for a certain level of clemency in legal proceedings.

Given the scope of mass starvation, cannibalism was relatively rare. Far more common was murder for ration cards. In the first six months of 1942, Leningrad witnessed 1,216 such murders. At the same time, Leningrad was experiencing its highest mortality rate, as high as 100,000 people per month. Lisa Kirschenbaum notes that rates "of cannibalism provided an opportunity for emphasizing that the majority of Leningraders managed to maintain their cultural norms in the most unimaginable circumstances."

Soviet relief of the siege

On 9 August 1942, the Symphony No. 7 "Leningrad" by Dmitri Shostakovich was performed by the Leningrad Radio Orchestra. The concert was broadcast on loudspeakers placed throughout the city and also aimed towards the enemy lines. The same day had been previously designated by Hitler to celebrate the fall of the city with a lavish banquet at Leningrad's Astoria Hotel, and was a few days before the Sinyavino Offensive.

Sinyavino Offensive

The Sinyavino Offensive was a Soviet attempt to break the blockade of the city in early autumn 1942. The 2nd Shock and the 8th armies were to link up with the forces of the Leningrad Front. At the same time the German side was preparing an offensive to capture the city, Operation Nordlicht (Northern Light), using the troops made available by the capture of Sevastopol. Neither side was aware of the other's intentions until the battle started.

The offensive began on 27 August 1942 with some small-scale attacks by the Leningrad front, pre-empting "Nordlicht" by a few weeks. The successful start of the operation forced the Germans to redirect troops from the planned "Nordlicht" to counterattack the Soviet armies. The counteroffensive saw the first deployment of the Tiger tank, though with limited success. After parts of the 2nd Shock Army were encircled and destroyed, the Soviet offensive was halted. However, the German forces also had to abandon their offensive.

Operation Iskra

The encirclement was broken in the wake of Operation Iskra (Spark), a full-scale offensive conducted by the Leningrad and Volkhov Fronts. This offensive started in the morning of 12 January 1943.

The Spanish Blue Division faced a major Soviet attempt to break the siege of Leningrad in February 1943, when the 55th Army of the Soviet forces, reinvigorated after the victory at Stalingrad, attacked the Spanish positions at the Battle of Krasny Bor, near the main Moscow-Leningrad road. Despite very heavy casualties, the Spaniards were able to hold their ground against a Soviet force seven times larger and supported by tanks. The Soviet assault was contained by the Blue Division.

Lifting the siege
The siege continued until 27 January 1944, when the Soviet Leningrad–Novgorod Offensive expelled German forces from the southern outskirts of the city. This was a combined effort by the Leningrad and Volkhov Fronts, along with the 1st and 2nd Baltic Fronts. The Baltic Fleet provided 30% of aviation power for the final strike against the Wehrmacht. In the summer of 1944, the Finnish Defence Forces were pushed back to the other side of the Bay of Vyborg and the Vuoksi River.

The siege was also known as the Leningrad Blockade and the 900-Day Siege.

Timeline
The timeline is based on various sources such as work done by David Glantz.

1941

April: Hitler intends to occupy and then destroy Leningrad, according to plan Barbarossa and Generalplan Ost.
22 June: The Axis powers' invasion of Soviet Union begins with Operation Barbarossa.
23 June: Leningrad commander M. Popov, sends his second in command to reconnoitre defensive positions south of Leningrad.
29 June: Construction of the Luga defence fortifications begins together with evacuation of children and women.
June–July: Over 300,000 civilian refugees from Pskov and Novgorod escaping from the advancing Germans come to Leningrad for shelter. The armies of the North-Western Front join the front lines at Leningrad. Total military strength with reserves and volunteers reaches 2 million men involved on all sides of the emerging battle.
27 July: Hitler visits Army Group North, angry at the delay. He orders Wilhelm Ritter von Leeb to take Leningrad by December.
31 July: Finns attack the Soviet 23rd Army at the Karelian Isthmus, eventually reaching northern pre-Winter War Finnish-Soviet border.
20 August – 8 September: Artillery bombardments of Leningrad hit industries, schools, hospitals and civilian houses.
21 August: Hitler's Directive No.34 orders "Encirclement of Leningrad in conjunction with the Finns."
20–27 August: Evacuation of civilians is blocked by attacks on railways and other exits from Leningrad.
31 August: Finnish forces go on the defensive and straighten their front line. This involves crossing the 1939 pre-Winter War border and occupation of municipalities of Kirjasalo and Beloostrov.
6 September: German High Command's Alfred Jodl fails to persuade Finns to continue offensive against Leningrad.
2–9 September: Finns capture the Beloostrov and Kirjasalo salients and conduct defensive preparations.
8 September: Land encirclement of Leningrad is completed when the German forces reach the shores of Lake Ladoga.
10 September: Joseph Stalin appoints General Zhukov to replace Marshal Voroshilov as Leningrad Front and Baltic Fleet commander.
12 September: The largest food depot in Leningrad, the Badajevski General Store, is destroyed by a German bomb.
15 September: Wilhelm Ritter von Leeb has to remove the 4th Panzer Group from the front lines and transfer it to Army Group Center for the Moscow offensive.
19 September: German troops are stopped  from Leningrad. Citizens join the fighting at the defence line
22 September: Hitler directs that "Saint Petersburg must be erased from the face of the Earth".
22 September: Hitler declares, "....we have no interest in saving lives of the civilian population."
8 November: Hitler states in a speech at Munich: "Leningrad must die of starvation."
10 November: Soviet counter-attack begins, and lasts until 30 December.
December: Winston Churchill wrote in his diary "Leningrad is encircled, but not taken."
6 December: The United Kingdom declared war on Finland. This was followed by declaration of war from Canada, Australia, India and New Zealand.
30 December: Soviet counter-attack, which began at 10 November, forced Germans to retreat from Tikhvin back to the Volkhov River, preventing them from joining Finnish forces stationed at the Svir River on the eastern shore of Lake Ladoga.

1942

7 January: Soviet Lyuban Offensive Operation is launched; it lasts 16 weeks and is unsuccessful, resulting in the loss of the 2nd Shock Army.
January: Soviets launch battle for the Nevsky Pyatachok bridgehead in an attempt to break the siege. This battle lasts until May 1943, but is only partially successful. Very heavy casualties are experienced by both sides.
4–30 April: Luftwaffe Operation Eis Stoß (ice impact) fails to sink Baltic Fleet ships iced in at Leningrad.
June–September: New German railway-mounted artillery bombards Leningrad with  shells.
August: The Spanish Blue Division (División Azul) transferred to Leningrad.
9 August 1942: The Symphony No. 7 "Leningrad" by Dmitri Shostakovich was performed in the city.
14 August – 27 October: Naval Detachment K clashes with Leningrad supply route on Lake Ladoga.
19 August: Soviets begin an eight-week-long Sinyavino Offensive, which fails to lift the siege, but thwarts German offensive plans (Operation Nordlicht).

1943

January–December: Increased artillery bombardments of Leningrad.
12–30 January: Operation Iskra penetrates the siege by opening a land corridor along the coast of Lake Ladoga into the city. The blockade is broken.
10 February – 1 April: The unsuccessful Operation Polyarnaya Zvezda attempts to lift the siege.

1944

14 January – 1 March: Several Soviet offensive operations begin, aimed at ending the siege.
27 January: Siege of Leningrad ends.
January: Before retreating, the German armies loot and destroy the historical Palaces of the Tsars, such as the Catherine Palace, the Peterhof Palace, the Gatchina Palace and the Strelna Palace. Many other historic landmarks and homes in the suburbs of St. Petersburg are looted and then destroyed, and a large number of valuable art collections are moved to Germany.

During the siege some 3,200 residential buildings, 9,000 wooden houses were burned, and 840 factories and plants were destroyed in Leningrad and suburbs.

Later evaluation

American evaluation
Historian Michael Walzer summarized that "The Siege of Leningrad killed more civilians than bombing of Hamburg, Dresden, Hiroshima and Nagasaki combined."
The US Military Academy evaluated that Russian casualties during the siege were bigger than combined American and British casualties during the entire war.

Genocide
Some 21st century historians, including Timo Vihavainen and Nikita Lomagin, have classified the siege of Leningrad as genocide due to the systematic starvation and intentional destruction of the city's civilian population.

Controversial issues

Controversy over Finnish participation
Almost all Finnish historians regard the siege as a German operation and do not consider that the Finns effectively participated in the siege. Russian historian Nikolai Baryshnikov argues that active Finnish participation did occur, but other historians have been mostly silent about it, most likely due to the friendly nature of post-war Soviet–Finnish relations.

The main issues which count in favour of the former view are: (a) the Finns mostly stayed at the pre-Winter War border at the Karelian Isthmus (with small exceptions to straighten the frontline), despite German wishes and requests, and (b) they did not bombard the city from planes or with artillery and did not allow the Germans to bring their own land forces to Finnish lines. Baryshnikov explains that the Finnish military in the region was strategically dependent on the Germans, and lacked the required means and will to press the attack against Leningrad any further.

Soviet deportation of civilians with enemy nations ethnic origin – Germans and Finns
Deportations of Finns and Germans from the Leningrad area to inhospitable areas of the Soviet Union began in March 1942 using the Road of Life; many of their descendants still remain in those areas today. The situation in blockaded Leningrad was worse than that in the eastern areas to which most Leningrad residents were evacuated. These inhospitable areas of the Soviet Union hosted millions of evacuees, and many factories, universities, and theatres were also relocated there.

Commemoration

Leningrad Siege and Defence Museum

Even during the siege itself, war artifacts were collected and shown to the public by city authorities, such as the German aeroplane that was shot down and fell to the ground in Tauricheskiy Garden. Such objects were displayed as a sign of the people's courage, and gathered in a specially allocated building of the former 19th century . The exhibition was soon turned into a full-scale .

Several years after World War II, from the late 1940s to the early 1950s, Stalin's supposed jealousy of Leningrad city leaders caused their destruction in the course of politically motivated show trials forming the post-WWII Leningrad Affair (the pre-war purge followed the 1934 assassination of the popular city ruler Sergey Kirov). Another generation of state and Communist Party functionaries of the city was wiped out, supposedly for publicly overestimating the importance of the city as an independent fighting unit and their own roles in defeating the enemy. Their brainchild, the Leningrad Defence Museum, was also destroyed, as were many valuable exhibits.

With the museum's revival during the wave of glasnost of the late 1980s new shocking facts were published, showing heroism of the wartime city along with hardships and even cruelties of the period. The exhibition opened in its originally allocated building, but has not yet regained its original size and area, most of its former premises having been occupied by military and other governmental offices. Plans for a new modern building of the museum have been suspended due to the financial crisis, although under the present Defence Secretary, Sergey Shoigu, promises have been made to expand the museum at its original location.

Monuments: The Green Belt of Glory and memorial cemeteries
Commemoration of the siege got a second wind during the 1960s. Local artists dedicated their achievements to the Victory and memory of the war they saw. A leading local poet and war participant Mikhail Dudin suggested erecting a ring of monuments on the places of heaviest siege-time fighting and linking them into a belt of gardens around the city showing where the advancing enemy armies were stopped forever. That was the beginning of the Green Belt of Glory.

On 29 October 1966, a monument entitled  (of the Siege) was erected at the 40th kilometer of the Road of Life, on the shore of Lake Ladoga near the village of Kokkorevo. Designed and created by Konstantin Simun, the monument pays tribute not only to the lives saved via the frozen Ladoga, but also the many lives broken by the blockade.

The  was erected on 9 May 1975 in Victory Square, Saint Petersburg.

The monument is a huge bronze ring with a gap in it, pointing towards the site that the Soviets eventually broke through the encircling German forces. In the centre a Russian mother cradles her dying soldier son. The monument has an inscription saying "900 days 900 nights". An exhibit underneath the monument contains artifacts from this period, such as journals.

Memorial cemeteries
During the siege, numerous deaths of civilians and soldiers led to considerable expansion of burial places later memorialised, of which the best known is Piskaryovskoye Memorial Cemetery.

Military parade on Palace Square

Every year, on 27 January, as part of the celebrations of the lifting of the siege, a military parade of the troops of the Western Military District and the Saint Petersburg Garrison on Palace Square takes place. Close to 3,000 soldiers and cadets take part in the parade, which includes historical reenactors in Red Army uniforms, wartime tanks such as the T-34 and color guards carrying wartime flags such as the Banner of Victory and the standards of the different military fronts. Musical support is provided by the Massed Military Bands of the St. Petersburg Garrison under the direction of the Senior Director of Music of the Military Band of the Western Military District.

See also

Consequences of Nazism
Effect of the siege of Leningrad on the city
List of famines
List of genocides by death toll
Ribbon of Leningrad Victory
World War II casualties

References

Notes

Bibliography

Further reading

Barskova, P. (2017). Besieged Leningrad: Aesthetic Responses to Urban Disaster . DeKalb: Northern Illinois University Press.
Barskova, Polina. "The Spectacle of the Besieged City: Repurposing Cultural Memory in Leningrad, 1941–1944." Slavic Review (2010): 327–355. online 
Clapperton, James. "The siege of Leningrad as sacred narrative: conversations with survivors." Oral History (2007): 49–60. online , primary sources
Jones, Michael. Leningrad: State of siege (Basic Books, 2008).

  Yarov, Sergey. Leningrad 1941-42: Morality in a City under Siege (Polity Press, 2017) online review

In Russian, German, and Finnish

External links

Documentary footage: 
"In the vortex of congealed time", by Oleg Yuriev. An overview of the literature of the Siege of Leningrad.
Russian State Memorial Museum of Defence and Siege of Leningrad (in Russian)
The Museum of the Siege of Leningrad at Google Cultural Institute

Eastern European theatre of World War II
Conflicts in 1941
Conflicts in 1942
Conflicts in 1943
Conflicts in 1944
World War II aerial operations and battles of the Eastern Front
Strategic operations of the Red Army in World War II
Sieges involving Germany
Sieges involving Italy
Sieges involving the Soviet Union
Siege Of
Baltic Sea operations of World War II
Battles and operations of World War II involving Germany
Battles and operations of the Soviet–German War
Incidents of cannibalism
Articles containing video clips
1940s in Leningrad
Sieges of World War II
Urban warfare